Nectria radicicola is a plant pathogen that is the causal agent of root rot. Substrates include ginseng and Narcissus. It is also implicated in the black foot disease of grapevine.

References

Bibliography

External links

Fungal plant pathogens and diseases
Food plant pathogens and diseases
Grapevine trunk diseases
radicicola
Fungi described in 1963